Kinesiophobia is the fear of pain due to movement.

It is a term used in the context of rehabilitation medicine and physical therapy.  Kinesiophobia is a factor that hinders rehabilitation and actually prolongs disability and pain.

Kinesiophobia can be a factor in increased time to return to participation in pre-injury activities. It has been shown that higher levels of kinesiophobia are linked to a lack of re-entry into pre-injury activities.

Research has been conducted to explore the level of association between kinesiophobia and pain in people with chronic musculoskeletal pain (CMP). The evidence this study presents reveals that there is a connection between a greater degree of kinesiophobia and greater levels of pain intensity. The study has also found moderate evidence between a greater level of kinesiophobia and higher levels of pain severity and quality of life among people with CMP. These results suggest that clinicians should consider kinesiophobia as an important factor in their preliminary assessment of CMP patients

References

Rehabilitation medicine

Sports medicine